Gladstone is a central district of Barry in the Vale of Glamorgan outside Cardiff in south Wales. It has a number of botanical gardens and is home to the Barry Memorial Hall, a school and has a bowling club and tennis courts.

References

Neighbourhoods of Barry, Vale of Glamorgan